Oklahoma Presbyterian College (also known as Oklahoma Presbyterian College for Girls) is a historic Presbyterian school at 601 N. 16th Street in Durant, Oklahoma.  The site, including two contributing buildings, was added to the National Register of Historic Places in 1976.

The main building is a three-story building, built during 1909-1910 of red brick with white stone trim.

In 1976 the two buildings served as headquarters and museum of the Red River Valley Historical Society.

Beginning in 1975, the building functioned as the Choctaw Nation's administrative headquarters until 2018 when the headquarters was relocated to a newly constructed building. The building still houses some Choctaw Nation employees, but remains largely empty since the move.

References

External links
Oklahoma Presbyterian College for Girls, Durant, Oklahoma, G.E.E. Lindquist collection, Native American photos, Columbia University

 https://lindquist.cul.columbia.edu/catalog/burke_lindq_055_1160

Presbyterian churches in Oklahoma
Churches on the National Register of Historic Places in Oklahoma
Religious buildings and structures completed in 1910
Buildings and structures in Bryan County, Oklahoma
School buildings on the National Register of Historic Places in Oklahoma
School buildings completed in 1910
National Register of Historic Places in Bryan County, Oklahoma